
In abstract algebra, the set of all partial bijections on a set X ( one-to-one partial transformations) forms an inverse semigroup, called the symmetric inverse semigroup (actually a monoid) on X. The conventional notation for the symmetric inverse semigroup on a set X is  or . In general  is not commutative.

Details about the origin of the symmetric inverse semigroup are available in the discussion on the origins of the inverse semigroup.

Finite symmetric inverse semigroups
When X is a finite set {1, ..., n}, the inverse semigroup of one-to-one partial transformations is denoted by Cn and its elements are called charts or partial symmetries. The notion of chart generalizes the notion of permutation. A (famous) example of (sets of) charts are the hypomorphic mapping sets from the reconstruction conjecture in graph theory.

The cycle notation of classical, group-based permutations generalizes to symmetric inverse semigroups by the addition of a notion called a path, which (unlike a cycle) ends when it reaches the "undefined" element; the notation thus extended is called path notation.

See also
Symmetric group

Notes

References

Semigroup theory
Algebraic structures